Goreh (also Romanized as Gorrah and Gorreh; also known as Gūreh and Gurreh) is a village in Liravi-ye Miyani Rural District, Imam Hassan District, Deylam County, Bushehr Province, Iran. At the 2006 census, its population was 23, in 4 families.

References 

Populated places in Deylam County